The Special Action Programme to Combat Forced Labour (SAP-FL) is the International Labour Organization (ILO) Programme combating forced labour and related issues. SAP-FL strives to provide evidence-based policy advice, tools and services to enable governments, employers’ and workers’ organizations and other partners to take effective, coordinated and rights-based action to prevent and eradicate forced labour. SAP-FL indicates that all human trafficking leads to forced labour.

Organizational background 
SAP-FL advocates and communicates so that policy makers and the public become aware of forced labour, the harm it causes to men, women and children, and what they can do to combat it.

Their work at global level is complemented by field-based operational projects which set out to develop, test and demonstrate the effectiveness of a distinct ILO approach to combating different manifestations of forced labour and human trafficking.

ILO Forced Labour Conventions 
ILO Forced Labour Convention, 1930 (No. 29), provides a general prohibition of the use of forced labour admitting only five exceptions to it. Its object and purpose is to suppress the use of forced labour in all its forms irrespective of the nature of the work or the sector of activity in which it may be performed.

ILO Abolition of Forced Labour Convention, 1957 (No. 105), supplements Convention No. 29 by defining specific circumstances under which forced labour is never allowed.

The use of forced labour is now almost universally banned, since the Conventions Nos. 29 and 105 are the most widely ratified of all ILO Conventions with 177 and 172 ratifications respectively.

The 1998 ILO Declaration on Fundamental Principles and Rights at Work commits ILO member states to respect, promote and realize the principle of the elimination of all forms of forced labour as one of the four fundamental principles, even if they have not ratified the forced labour Conventions.

International definitions

Forced Labour Convention, 1930 (No. 29) 
The article 2 of Convention No. 29 defines [forced labour] as:

"all work or service which is exacted from any person under the menace of any penalty and for which the said person has not offered himself voluntarily."

The key elements of this definition are:

Menace of any penalty is to be understood in a very broad sense. It can be direct or indirect physical violence, psychological coercion or economic compulsion used against a worker, his/her relatives or close associates. The penalty does not only refer to penal sanctions, but may also take the form of a loss of rights or privileges. For example, imprisonment or other physical confinement, financial penalties, dismissal from employment or loss of promotion, threat of denunciation to authorities, or deprivation of food, shelter or other necessities may constitute a menace of a penalty.

The absence of a voluntary offer refers to the principle that all work relations should be founded on the mutual consent of the contracting parties. The worker must have a right to freely choose to enter into employment and also freely leave the employment at any time with reasonable notice in accordance with national law or collective agreement. The consent to work has to be freely given and informed, and exist throughout the employment relationship. This means that there is never voluntary offer under coercion or threat, neither when deception and fraud are used. Besides, the given consent is also considered irrelevant when it is obtained by abusing the vulnerability of the worker.

All work or service includes all types of work, service and employment, regardless of the industry or sector within which it is found, including occupations not considered as employment in certain countries, such as begging, prostitution or domestic service in private household. It encompasses legal and formal employment as well as illegal and informal employment.

Any person includes any human being – adult or child. It is considered irrelevant whether the person is a national of the country or whether the person works legally or illegally in the country.

Means of coercion
A case of forced labour is essentially determined by the nature of the relationship between a worker and an ‘employer.’ The crucial element is the coercion on the part of the employer or recruiter and the lack of free, informed consent of the worker. Thanks to this broad definition and the elements provided in it, the convention is a ‘living instrument’ that covers traditional forms of forced labour as well as contemporary forms, for example, those linked to human trafficking.

In practice, forced labour is a situation where a person is not free to leave his or her work because of threats, debts, or other forms of physical or psychological coercion.

Some examples of means of coercion:
 Physical or sexual violence against workers or their family
 Restriction of movements
 Deprivation of food
 Debt bondage / manipulated debt
 Withholding or non-payment of wages
 Retention of identity documents
 Threat of denunciation to authorities
 Kidnapping or abduction
 Sale of the person
 Slave status by birth
 Deception /false promises about work

Exceptions
The Convention specified some exceptions, such as:
 Compulsory military service for work of purely military character
 Work or service performed as part of normal civic obligations, such as jury duty
 Work or service performed in emergency situations, such as flood, fire, famine, earthquake
 Minor communal services, provided that members of community agree on need for services

Abolition of Forced Labour Convention, 1957 (No. 105)
ILO Convention No. 105 on Abolition of Forced Labour specifies that forced labour, as defined by Convention No. 29, can never be used as means of political coercion, for the purpose of economic development, discrimination, labour discipline or as a punishment for having participated in strikes

ILO Convention No. 105 strengthens ILO Convention No. 29 on Forced Labour by requiring the abolition of forced labour:
 As means of political coercion or education or as punishment for political views
 As means of mobilizing labour for economic development
 As means of labour discipline
 As punishment for strikes
 As means of racial, social, national or religious discrimination

Forms of forced labour
Forced labour can take many forms. While the initial emphasis in combating forced labour was on state-imposed practices, the majority of forced labour takes place in the private economy and the coercion takes indirect and subtle forms, making it more difficult to combat forced labour.

The main forms of forced labour include:
 Debt-induced forced labour, commonly referred to as ‘bonded labour’ or ‘debt bondage,’ under which labourers and their families are forced to work for an employer in order to pay off their actually incurred or inherited debts. The labour service is rarely defined or limited in duration, and it tends to be manipulated in such a way that it does not pay off the debt.
 Forced labour as an outcome of trafficking in persons, fuelled by organised criminal networks or individuals. It can begin with the contacting of an employment agency offering work abroad. Once recruited and transported to the destination country, workers’ employment conditions are changed, documents withheld, and coercion is applied, resulting in forced labour.
 Practices of slavery, still in existence, transmitted by birth to individuals from certain ethnic groups, who are compelled to work for their masters.
 State-imposed forms of forced labour, such as prison labour when prisoners are forced to work for profit-making private enterprises; military labour when civilians are forced to work for government or the military; or compulsory work on public construction projects.

Facts and figures about forced labour

Global estimates
Forced labour affects virtually all countries and all kinds of economies. According to the ILO, at least 12.3 million men, women and children are victims of forced labour. Of these, 9.8 million are exploited by private agents, including more than 2.4 million in forced labour as a result of human trafficking. Some 56 per cent of all persons in forced labour are women and girls. Women and girls also constitute 98% of victims forced to commercial sexual exploitation.

Regional distribution of forced labour
At least 12.3 million men, women and children are victims of forced labour. The highest numbers have been found in Asia where some 9.4 million victims are forced to work, followed by approximately 1.3 million in Latin America and the Caribbean, at least 360,000 in the industrialized countries and 210,000 in transition countries. In Sub Saharan Africa and MENA region (Middle East and North Africa) respectively 260,000 and 660,000 victims where identified.

Regional distribution of human trafficking
More than 2.4 million persons are in forced labour as a result of human trafficking. 43% of those trafficked are used for forced commercial sexual exploitation (98% are women and girls); 32% for forced economic exploitation; and 25% for a mixture of the both or for undetermined reasons.
 Asia and the Pacific - 1,360,000
 Industrialized countries - 270,000
 Latin America and Caribbean - 250,000
 Middle East and North Africa - 230,000
 Transition Countries - 200,000
 Sub Saharan Africa - 130,000

Profits
The ILO Global Report (2005) estimated at US$31.7 billion the total illicit profits produced in one year by traffickers. Further ILO research at that time indicated that, worldwide, total illegal profits made from forced labourers in economic exploitation, outside the sex industry, reached US$10.4 billion.

In the Global Report (2009), the cost of coercion to forced labourers was estimated to amount some US$21 billion. The “stolen opportunity costs” are taken through underpaid wages (including forced overtime –long days of work up to 16 hours or more; seven days a week – and other forms of “excessive work” – including the work of family members, such as wives and children who contribute to the production of goods and services but receive no payment); recruitment costs (including payments to a recruitment agency or a broker, funding a particular type of training necessary for being eligible for admission to the destination country, acquiring language skills, or payment for the visa and transportation. The amount may vary from US$150 in poor regions to an average of more than US$5,000 for securing a job in industrial countries); or unfair deductions (bonded labourers repay a loan through their work and face deductions for food, tools, housing or employers charges).

References

External links 
 ILO Website (English)
 United Nations Office on Drugs and Crime (UNODC)
 The Group of Experts on Action against Trafficking in Human Beings (GRETA)
 Pakistan Press Foundation

International Labour Organization
Organizations established by the United Nations